Mimi Gets a Grandpa is a 1990 Viveca Sundvall children's book in the Mimmi series. 

Originally written in Swedish, it has since been translated into and published in English.

Plot
It's autumn. Mimmi is a seven and a half years old girl. Roberta Karlsson is nine years old. They believe Enok, who runs a shoestore, is a criminal. They follow him across the path towards a forest glade where he goes fishing at a tarn. Enok  discovers the girls, and they begin to talk, before Enok returns to the store.

Mimmi and Roberta sneak into the shoe store, and hide. Suddenly Enok activates the lights, discovering the girls. It appears Enok is no criminal. He becomes like a grandfather to the girls.

References

Mimmi och kexfabriken, Rabén & Sjögren, 1990

1990 children's books
Rabén & Sjögren books
Works by Viveca Lärn